IBM Hakozaki Facility in Nihonbashi-Hakozaki-cho, Chuo-ku, Tokyo, Japan, is IBM's largest building in Japan, in terms of the number of people working there. It mainly houses IBM's marketing and market support departments, and  since October 2009  headquarters, which moved from Roppongi, Tokyo. It was built for IBM in 1989.

General description
IBM Hakozaki Facility is located at 19-21 Nihonbashi-Hakozaki-cho, Chuo-ku, Tokyo, on the right bank of the Sumida River. It houses mainly IBM's marketing and systems engineering departments, and is IBM's largest facility in Japan, in terms of the number of people working there. Because of the seminars and demonstrations of the latest products and services frequently held there, it is also familiar to many users and potential users of IBM.

Its main building was completed in 1989, designed by Takenaka Corporation, and is owned and leased by Mitsui-Soko, Mitsui Group's warehousing & distribution company. The building complex also houses cafeterias, restaurants, a post office, a bookstore, a gym and a tea ceremony house.

Access
The facility can be accessed from Suitengūmae Station on the Tokyo Metro Hanzomon Line, Ningyōchō Station on the Toei Asakusa Line, Tokyo City Air Terminal, and from the Toei Bus bus stop.

See also
 IBM Yamato Facility (R&D formerly)
 IBM Toyosu Facility (R&D)

References

External links
 Hakozaki Facility, IBM Japan, Ltd. (in Japanese)

IBM facilities
Buildings and structures completed in 1989
1989 establishments in Japan
Buildings and structures in Koto, Tokyo